Martin Stejskal (born 19 February 1944, pronounced: stei-skal) is a Czech painter, graphic artist, translator, occasional poet, essayist, and author of texts and books dealing with different aspects of Hermeticism.

Career 

Stejskal had decisive encounters with poet Karel Šebek (1963) and hermetist Theofanus Abba (1972). Šebek was an important poet from the Czech Surrealists circle from the 1960s. He disappeared in 2004. Theofanus Abba (the civic name of Josef Louda) was a Czech hermetic.

Since 1968 he has worked with Czech and Slovak surrealists. Stejskal authored interpretation methods, for instance contourages and phased illusions. He creates computer graphics (so-called digitages) and original computer animations. He lives in Prague.

Selected individual exhibitions 
 Hra proti „hře“/ A Game Against “the Game’’ (Dům uměni, Brno, Czech Republic 1972)
 Peintures et dessins (L’envers du miroir Gallery, Paris France 1972)
 Zjištené polohy / Estahlished Positions (Zemědělské museum, Lednice, Czech Republic 1985)
 Imaginace prostoru / The imagination of Space (Juniorklub Chmelnice, Praha, Czech Republic 1985)
  Zadem k nekonečnu / Backward to the Infinity (Palác kultury, Galerie Vyšehrad, Praha, Czech Republic 1990)
 Problem merkuryáse / Merkuryas problem (Paseka Gallery, Praha, Czech Republic 1992)
 Dva čeští surrealisté / Two Czech Surrealists (H. Beekman's cabinet, Alkmaar Holland //with J. Švankmajer/ 1992)
 Strážci prahu /  Guardians of the Threshold (Paseka Gallery, Praha, Czech Republic 1997)
 Bít či nebít? / To Beat or Not to Beat? (Shamballa Gallery, Copenhagen, Denmark, 1998)
 Zadem k nekonečnu II / Backward to Infinity II - a selection of works 1968-2002 ( Galerie moderniho uměni, Hradec Kralové, Alšova Jihočeská Gallery České Budějovice, Galerie vytvarného uměni, Cheb,  Czech Republic 2003).

Publications in English / French 
 1971 : Pas à pas, Face arrière des nouveaux tableaux, B.L.S, réédition Savelli 1978, no. 4. p. 32. Paris
 1974 : Maisons, 14 lithos accompagnées de poèmes de Vincent Bounoure, Collection du B.L.S., Paris
 1976 : La civilisation surréaliste, collection de textes choisis présenté par Vincent Bounoure, La rélation cérémonielle, Payot, Paris, p. 307.  
 1977 : Sans cesse en rond, voix off, cycle de métamorphoses, avec le text de Jean-Louis Bédouin, revue Surréalisme, ed. Savelli, Paris, p. 24–28.
 1989 : Prague, Secrets et métamorphoses, article La Prague des alchimistes, p. 129–137, ed. Autrement, Paris
 1997 : Secrets de la Prague magique, ed. Dauphin, Prague, 
 2003 : Praga hermetica (La guide ésotérique à travers Route royale), ed. Eminent, Prague, 
 2004 : Porte arrière à l'infini, monographie de M. S., Prague, 
 2014 : Prague insolite et secrète, (photo: Jana Stejskalová), ed. Jonglez, Paris. 2. ed. 2018. 
 2018 : Tarot Alchymicus T. Abbae, card game, lat. and engl., ed. Vodnář.

References

External links 
 Images and drawings Martin Stejskal
 Texts about Martin Stejskal
 The Surrealist Group in Czechoslovakia 
Revue with contributions by M. S.
  ANALOGON
  LOGOS
 ARSENAL, Chicago, USA 
 Dreamdew n. 23
 International Surrealist Bulletin
  Surréalisme n. 1

Czech male painters
1944 births
Living people
Czech translators
20th-century Czech painters
20th-century Czech poets
21st-century painters
21st-century Czech poets
Czech graphic designers
Czech essayists
Occasional poets
20th-century Czech male artists